Cereal chlorotic mottle virus (CCMoV) is a plant pathogenic virus of the family Rhabdoviridae. It is a cicadellid-transmitted plant rhabdovirus associated with chlorotic and necrotic streaks on several gramineous hosts and weeds.

External links
ICTVdB – The Universal Virus Database: Cereal chlorotic mottle virus
Family Groups – The Baltimore Method

Viral plant pathogens and diseases
Nucleorhabdoviruses